Ramsey Creek is a stream in the U.S. state of Minnesota.

Ramsey Creek was named for Alexander Ramsey, first territorial governor and second governor of Minnesota.

See also
List of rivers of Minnesota

References

Rivers of Redwood County, Minnesota
Rivers of Renville County, Minnesota
Rivers of Minnesota